Doctors Hospital or Doctor's Hospital may refer to:

Hospitals
Doctors Hospital (San Pablo, California)
Doctors Hospital (Beverly Hills, California)
Doctors Hospital (Coral Gables, Florida)
Doctors Hospital (Sarasota, Florida)
Doctors Hospital (Augusta, Georgia), a 350-bed full-service tertiary care center located in Augusta, Georgia
Doctors Hospital (Springfield, Illinois), a former for-profit hospital in Springfield, Illinois
Doctor's Hospital  (Lanham, Maryland), a full-service hospital located in Lanham, Maryland, a northeastern suburb of Washington, D.C.
Doctors Hospital (Omaha, Nebraska), now CHI Health Midlands 
Doctors Hospital (Manhattan, New York) 
Doctors Hospital (Staten Island, New York), a for-profit hospital located in the Concord section of Staten Island
Doctors Hospital (Columbus, Ohio), a religiously-affiliated hospital located in Columbus, Ohio
Doctors Hospital (Nelsonville, Ohio)
Doctors Hospital of Laredo
Doctors Hospital (Seattle, Washington), now integrated with Swedish Medical Center
Doctors Hospital, Lahore, Lahore, Pakistan
 The Doctor's Hospital, Toronto from 1953 to 1998. Now known as Kensington Health Centre

Television
Doctors' Hospital, medical drama that ran on NBC during the 1975–1976 season

See also
Cebu Doctors' University Hospital, a major tertiary private hospital in Cebu City, the Philippines